Pavie Ridge or Cap Pavie or Île Pavie is a rocky ridge located at  in Antarctica which rises over 500 m. It extends south and west from Martin Glacier to Moraine Cove, and forms the southeastern limit of the Bertrand Ice Piedmont, on the west coast of Graham Land.

From a position 15 miles southeast of Jenny Island, Maurice Bongrain, surveyor of the French Antarctic Expedition, made sketches of this feature which were labeled "Île Pavie" and "Cap Pavie". Pavie Ridge was named by Charcot presumably for Auguste J. M. Pavie (1847-1925), French diplomat and explorer.

This general area was surveyed in 1936 by the British Graham Land Expedition (BGLE) under John Riddoch Rymill, but the feature already named by Charcot was not identified. After later surveys by the Falkland Islands Dependencies Survey (FIDS) in 1948, Charcot's "Île Pavie" was identified from Bongrain's sketches as the feature now named Red Rock Ridge. The name Red Rock Ridge had become too firmly established to alter; thus, the original name Pavie Ridge has been approved for the isolated rocky ridge described above as forming the southern limit of the Bertrand Ice Piedmont. Its position is not far removed from the original position indicated by Charcot.

References

Ridges of Graham Land
Fallières Coast